Puya paupera is a species in the genus Puya. This species is endemic to Bolivia.

References

 

paupera
Flora of Bolivia